is a Prefectural Natural Park in northern Kagoshima Prefecture, Japan. Established in 1964, the park spans the municipalities of Isa, Izumi, Satsuma, and Satsumasendai.

See also
 National Parks of Japan

References

Parks and gardens in Kagoshima Prefecture
Protected areas established in 1964
1964 establishments in Japan